Newfoundland expedition was a 1796 Franco-Spanish expedition during the French Revolutionary Wars.

Newfoundland expedition may also refer to:

Newfoundland expedition (1585), an English naval expedition in 1585
Newfoundland expedition (1696) of Pierre Le Moyne d'Iberville against English settlements during King William's War
Newfoundland expedition (1702) of Commodore John Leake against French settlements during Queen Anne's War

See also
Siege of St. John's, part of a French expedition against English settlements in 1705
Battle of St. John's, part of a French expedition against English settlements in 1709
Battle of Signal Hill, the British response to a French expedition against St. John's in 1762